Prunus kotschyi is a plant first described by Pierre Edmond Boissier and Rudolph Friedrich Hohenacker, and received its current name from a revision by Robert Desmond Meikle. No subspecies are known. It is native to Iraq.

References

External links 

kotschyi
Taxa named by Pierre Edmond Boissier
Taxa named by Rudolph Friedrich Hohenacker
Taxa named by Édouard Spach
Taxa named by Robert Desmond Meikle